Butterfly Valley, or Wu Tip Kuk, is a valley in north of Lai Chi Kok in New Kowloon of Hong Kong, located between O Pui Shan and Piper's Hill.

The valley is named for the buttery habitat that existed prior to the Japanese occupation of Hong Kong. The butterflies lived in a forest, which was destroyed as part of the Japanese military's efforts to obtain wood. This resulted in the extinction of the butterflies, despite later attempts to bring back the butterfly population.

On the lower section of the valley, there is a demolished squatter town named Wai Man Tsuen. The site is now part of Route 8. The upper section is part of a country park.

The Cheung Sha Wang Roman Catholic Cemetery and Yew Chung International School of Hong Kong are located on the side above Piper's Hill. Above O Pui Shan is the O Pui Shan Boy's Home.

A river used to run through Butterfly Valley. Its upper course was blocked to collect water for the Kowloon Reservoirs, while its lower course has become a covered nullah under Butterfly Valley Road on the border between Lai Chi Kok and Cheung Sha Wan.

Despite its proximity to Lai Chi Kok, a large part of valley in fact belongs to Kwai Tsing District.

References 

Valleys of Hong Kong
Lai Chi Kok